Larinus is a genus of true weevils, comprising about 180 species, mostly in the Palaearctic region.
Turkey appears to have a significant diversity of the group, with more than 50 species recorded in the Eastern part of the country.

Several of these beetles are used as agents of biological pest control against noxious weeds. They feed on flower heads, destroying the developing seeds of the weeds.

Species
These species belong to the genus Larinus:

 Larinus araxicola Gultekin, 2006
 Larinus bombycinus Lucas, H., 1847 c g
 Larinus brevis 
 Larinus bronni Heyden, C. von & Heyden, L. von., 1866 c g
 Larinus byrrhinus (Sparrman, A., 1785) c g
 Larinus cardopatii Lucas, H., 1847 c g
 Larinus carlinae Olivier, 1807 c g
 Larinus carthami Olivier, 1807 g
 Larinus centaurea Oliver, 1807
 Larinus centaurii Olivier, 1807 c g
 Larinus cuniculus Olivier, 1807 c g
 Larinus curtus Hochhuth, 1851 c b (yellow star thistle flower weevil)
 Larinus cylindrus Hoffmann, 1963 g
 Larinus cynarae (Fabricius, J.C., 1787) c g
 Larinus filiformis Petri
 Larinus flavescens 
 Larinus gigas
 Larinus gravidus Olivier, 1807 c g
 Larinus grisescens Gyllenhal 
 Larinus hierolosymae Desbrochers, 1896 g
 Larinus iaceae (Fabricius, J.C., 1775) c g
 Larinus jaceae (Fabricius, 1775) g
 Larinus latus (Herbst, J.F.W., 1783) c g
 Larinus longirostris Foerster, B., 1891 c g
 Larinus minutus Gyllenhal, 1835 c b (seedhead weevil)
 Larinus nanus Lucas, H., 1847 c g
 Larinus numidicus Desbrochers, 1892 c g
 Larinus obtusus Sturm, 1826 b (knapweed seedhead weevil)
 Larinus ochreatus Schoenherr, 1835 c g
 Larinus onopordi (Fabricius, J.C., 1787) c g
 Larinus orientalis Capiomont, 1874
 Larinus planus (Fabricius, 1792) i c g b (Canada thistle bud weevil, 2016 synonym of L. carlinae)
 Larinus pollinis (Laicharting, J.N.E. von, 1781) c g
 Larinus scolymi Germar, 1824 c g
 Larinus senilis Fabricius, 1801 c g
 Larinus serratulae Capiomont, 1874 c g
 Larinus sibiricus
 Larinus sturnus Schaller, 1783 c g
 Larinus turbinatus Gyllenhal, 1835 c b
 Larinus ursus Germar, 1824 c g
 Larinus vulpes Olivier, 1807 c g

Data sources: i = ITIS, c = Catalogue of Life, g = GBIF, b = Bugguide.net

References

 

Lixinae
Beetles of Asia
Beetles of Europe
Biological pest control